Sefid castle is a historical castle located in Meybod County in Yazd Province, The longevity of this fortress dates back to the Afsharid dynasty and Zand dynasty.

References 

Castles in Iran